is a Japanese politician of the Democratic Party of Japan and was a member of the House of Representatives and House of Councillors in the Diet (national legislature) from 1976 to 1993 and 1998 to 2010 respectively.

A native of Tochio, Niigata and graduate of Takushoku University, he was elected to the House of Representatives in the 1976 general election as part of the ruling Liberal Democratic Party, and re-elected five times before losing his seat in the pivotal 1993 general election.

He joined the New Frontier Party in 1997 and then won a seat on the Liberal Party proportional representation slate for the House of Councillors in the 1998 election. He led electoral cooperation talks between the LP and LDP which broke down in March 2000 concurrently with failed merger talks between party presidents Keizo Obuchi and Ichiro Ozawa. The LP subsequently merged with the Democratic Party of Japan and Watanabe retained his House of Councillors seat on the DPJ slate in the 2004 election.

He left the DPJ in 2008 to start the Reform Club, which became the New Renaissance Party in April 2010 under the leadership of Yoichi Masuzoe. Watanabe retired from politics upon refusing to run in the 2010 House of Councillors election.

Watanabe is the chairman of Japan-Myanmar Friendship Association. Watanabe first provided aid to Myanmar in 1987 and then began interacting with the military. He has had close ties with the military's proxy Union Solidarity and Development Party since the time of ex-general Thein Sein’s quasi-civilian government. It is said that he has been close to Senior General Min Aung Hlaing for over a decade, and they met shortly before and after the February 2021 coup. Following the military coup d'état, he told The Asahi Shimbun newspaper that Min Aung Hlaing had not staged a coup but "done what he should have in accordance with the law". In November 2022, he was awarded the title of Thiri Pyanchi, one of the country's highest honors.

References 

 

1934 births
Living people
Politicians from Niigata Prefecture
Takushoku University alumni
Members of the House of Representatives (Japan)
Members of the House of Councillors (Japan)
Liberal Democratic Party (Japan) politicians
Democratic Party of Japan politicians
New Renaissance Party politicians